DXSS-TV, channel 7 - better known as SBN 7 Davao, is a commercial VHF television station owned and operated by Southern Broadcasting Network, a subsidiary of Solar Entertainment Corporation. Its studios and transmitter are located at SBN Compound, Shrine Hills, Matina, Davao City (near ABS-CBN). At present, SBN 7 Davao carries Solar Learning 1 (DepED ALS), while the remaining stations carrying the flagship channel SolarFlix. SBN 7 Davao operates daily from 8 am to 11 pm (PST).

Current and former local programs
Oras ng Katotohanan
News at Seven Davao (later renamed as News on Seven Davao) (affiliated with GMA Network) (1970s-1990s)
Goot da Wanderpol (late 1980s-early 1990s, syndicated from GMA Cebu)

Areas of coverage

Primary areas  
 Davao City
 Davao Del Sur

Secondary areas 
 Davao Del Norte
 Davao de Oro
 Portion of Davao Oriental
 Portion of General Santos
 Portion of South Cotabato

References

Southern Broadcasting Network
ETC (Philippine TV channel) stations
DXSS-TV
Television channels and stations established in 1965
1965 establishments in the Philippines